Luke O'Reilly (born 30 January 1988) is a Northern Irish actor and musician, perhaps best known for his work in the CITV series Bel's Boys, and as part of the band of the same name.

Early life
O'Reilly was born in Derry, Northern Ireland and was brought up in a working-class neighbourhood. His parents, both keen tap-dancing performers in their youth, sent him at the age of three to a speech and drama academy for juniors. He played the lead role of Stanley Kowalski in his nursery school's production of A Streetcar Named Desire, prompting Roger Ebert (of the Chicago Sun-Times) to say "he [O'Reilly] is one of the great four year old Kowalskis." After getting the "A" in the Eleven plus he attended the grammar school St. Columb's College, alma mater to Seamus Heaney and Feargal Sharkey.

Career

Early fame
O'Reilly, at the age of eleven, first gained national attention as the face of Bus Éireann. It was at this time he picked up his first guitar, beginning his foray into popular music. Other commercial opportunities presented themselves in the form of British Telecom (alongside James Nesbitt) and as "Johnny" for Coleraine Cheddar. He and bandmate Graham McKee first met on the set of sitcom Give My Head Peace.

Bel's Boys
He and McKee soon began exchanging musical ideas. They held open auditions for a drummer and after a three-month-long search they found Eoin Logan. Without a record deal the band struggled to survive but their demo tape was found by Bel Barter, the daughter of a talent agent. She fell in love with their ill-contrived sound and, in a record industry first, a band were signed to a major deal by a nine-year-old girl. Endemol productions were so inspired by the band's "rags to riches" story that the events were dramatised for a CITV serial, also titled Bel's Boys. Due to filming commitments O'Reilly had to drop out of full-time education, but he still achieved three "B" grades at A level. On the back of the television success the band embarked on a headline tour of UK primary schools, culminating in a main-stage performance at the 21st World Scout Jamboree. This was the height of the band's success and they went their separate ways in 2007.

On 2 July 2012, O'Reilly announced via Twitter that he will be publishing a book about his time in the band with the title I-before-E Except in O'Reilly.

Personal life
O'Reilly is currently pursuing a degree in English and Drama at Goldsmiths, University of London.

References

1988 births
Living people
Male television actors from Northern Ireland
Male singers from Northern Ireland
Musicians from Derry (city)
Pop singers from Northern Ireland
People educated at St Columb's College
Male actors from County Londonderry
Actors from Derry (city)